Icomb is a village in the Gloucestershire Cotswolds, near to Stow on the Wold. The population taken at the 2011 census was 202.

The village appears as Iacumbe in the Domesday Book.

Parish Church
The Church of St Mary is the parish church which has a Norman north doorway and an Early English south porch and doorway dating from around 1249. It is a grade I listed building.

Icomb Place
The Grade 1 Listed building Icomb Place on edge of the village was significantly altered by Sir John Blaket in 1421, a knight who fought with Henry V at the Battle of Agincourt and died in 1431, whose tomb is in the church.

References

External links

Villages in Gloucestershire
Cotswold District
Cotswolds